Songs for Polarbears is the debut album by the Scottish-Northern Irish indie rock group Snow Patrol, released on 31 August 1998 in the UK and 12 October in the US.

The album charted at #143 in the UK and did not sell well upon its initial release. However, its re-release eventually went Gold in the UK.

Background
The band was listening to a diverse range of music at the time, with majority of it being American rock like Pixies, Soundgarden and Dinosaur Jr. Other acts included My Bloody Valentine and Super Furry Animals' first album Fuzzy Logic. All these influences resulted in a musically diverse album that incorporated styles like hip hop, drone and Pavement-style indie rock. The album title is a reference to the band's previous name Polarbear.

Track listing

"Marketplace" (3:48) is included as a hidden track after "One Hundred Things You Should Have Done in Bed" on both versions.

All bonus tracks originally appeared as B-sides to the singles released from Songs for Polarbears.

Personnel
Snow Patrol
Gary Lightbody – vocals, guitar, keyboards, drums on "Riot, Please"
Mark McClelland – bass guitar, keyboards
Jonny Quinn – drums

Other personnel
Richard Colburn – drums, keyboards on track 2
Isobel Campbell – vocals on track 7
Fraser Simpson – guitar on track 11

Charts

Certifications

References

1998 debut albums
Snow Patrol albums
Jeepster Records albums